Leandro Coll Riera (17 May 1895 – 2 April 1975) was a Spanish rower. He competed in two events at the 1924 Summer Olympics.

References

External links
 

1895 births
1975 deaths
Spanish male rowers
Olympic rowers of Spain
Rowers at the 1924 Summer Olympics
Rowers from Barcelona